Prince Heinrich of Hesse and by Rhine (Heinrich Ludwig Wilhelm Adalbert Waldemar Alexander; November 28, 1838 - September 16, 1900) was a member of the House of Hesse-Darmstadt and a General of the Cavalry.

Biography
He was the second son of Prince Charles of Hesse and by Rhine and Princess Elisabeth of Prussia and a younger brother of the later Louis IV, Grand Duke of Hesse. Heinrich studied in Göttingen and Giessen and joined the Hessian army as a lieutenant in 1854. In 1859 he joined the Prussian Army as a captain and fought in the First Schleswig War and the Austro-Prussian War. 

On 17 September, 1866, Heinrich became commander of the 2nd Guards Uhlan Regiment. He led the regiment during the Franco-Prussian War and received the Iron Cross (2nd class). In 1873, Heinrich was promoted to Generalmajor. In 1879 he became commander of the 25th (Grand Ducal Hessian) Division and shortly afterwards was promoted to Lieutenant General. On August 21, 1884 Heinrich was given the distinction of a Commanding General and two years later,  on September 18, 1886, was promoted to General of the Cavalry. On 7 July 1887, Heinrich retired and received the Pour le Mérite; being the final recipient by order of William I as the latter died in the next year.

In retirement he eventually settled in Munich. From 1881 until his death he also was a member of the Hessian Landstände.

Marriage and children 
Heinrich married morganatically on February 25, 1878, Caroline Willich von Pöllnitz (1848-1879) who was created Freifrau von Nidda for the occasion. She died after the birth of their only child Karl, Count of Nidda (1879-1920).

He married again in 1892 - also morganatically, to Emilie Hrzic de Topuska (1868-1961). She was elevated to Freifrau von Dornberg. They had also one son: Elimar, Freiherr von Dornberg (1893-1917), who died in an accident.

Honours
He received the following orders and decorations:

References

Sources 
geni.com
 

1838 births
1900 deaths
House of Hesse-Darmstadt
Military personnel from Darmstadt
Members of the First Chamber of the Estates of the Grand Duchy of Hesse
Generals of Cavalry (Prussia)
German military personnel of the Franco-Prussian War
Recipients of the Pour le Mérite (military class)
Recipients of the Iron Cross (1870), 2nd class
Recipients of the Military Merit Cross (Mecklenburg-Schwerin)
Grand Crosses of the Order of the Star of Romania
Recipients of the Order of the White Eagle (Russia)
Recipients of the Order of St. Anna, 1st class
Recipients of the Order of St. George of the Fourth Degree
Honorary Knights Grand Cross of the Order of the Bath
Nobility from Darmstadt
Prussian people of the Austro-Prussian War
Burials at the Mausoleum for the Grand Ducal House of Hesse, Rosenhöhe (Darmstadt)